This is a list of active and extinct volcanoes in Spain.

Canary Islands

Lanzarote 
Caldera Blanca
Cerro Tegoyo
Guanapay
Massif of Marissa
Massif of Los Ajaches
Montaña de El Golfo
Montaña Negra
Pico Colorado
Timanfaya Volcanic Field
Volcan of La Corona

Fuerteventura 
Caldera Los Arrabales
Calderón Hondo
Lobos Island Volcanic Field
Massif of Betancuria
Massif of Haler
Montaña Blanca
Montaña de La Arena
Montaña de la Raya
Montaña de Tindaya
Volcanes de Babuyo
Vulcan de Jacomar

Gran Canaria 
Bandama Caldera
Caldera de Tejeda
La Isleta volcanic field
Massif of Güigüi
Massif of Tamadaba
Haler de Arinaga
Montaña de Arucas
Montaña de Gáldar
Montañón Negro
Pico de las Nieves
Caldera de Tirajana
Stratovolcano of Roque Nublo

Tenerife 
Alto de Guajara
Caldera of Las Canadas
Massif of Anaga
Massif of Teno
Montana de Las Arenas
Pedro Gil ridge
Teide
Teno ridge
Vulcan of Arafo
Vulcan of Chahorra
Vulcan Chinyero
Vulcan of Fasnia

La Gomera 
Roque de Agando

La Palma 
 Caldera de Taburiente
 Cumbre Vieja
Duraznero Volcano
Hoyo Negro
Pico Birigoyo
Volcán San Juan
Vulcan of San Antonio
Vulcan of Martín
Vulcan of El Charco
Teneguía

El Hierro 
Pico de Malpaso
Tagoro
Tanganosoga
Vulcan of Lomo Negro

Mainland Spain 
There are several volcanic areas in mainland Spain, such as:
Cabo de Gata, Almería
Campo de Calatrava, Ciudad Real
Cofrentes, Valencia 
Columbretes Islands, Castellón
Zona Volcànica de la Garrotxa Natural Park, Girona
Campo de Cartagena, Cartagena (Upper Miocene)
Isla Grosa, in the Mediterranean east of La Manga del Mar Menor
Cerro del Calnegre and Monteblanco, on La Manga del Mar Menor
Isla Mayor o del Barón, Isla Perdiguera, Isla del Ciervo, Isla Rondella o Redonda and Isla del Sujeto in the Mar Menor
El Carmolí, on the landward coast of the Mar Menor.
Cabezo Beaza, Cabezo de la Fraila and Cabezo Ventura, on the eastern edge of Cartagena
Volcán Aljorra, northwest of Cartagena
Cabezo Negro de Tallante, Pico Cebolla and Los Pérez, west-northwest of Cartagena

Garrotxa Volcanic Zone
There are 40 volcanoes at the comarca of the Garrotxa, 38 of which are part of the Zona Volcànica de la Garrotxa Natural Park.
Volcà de la Canya
Volcà d’Aiguanegra
Volcà de Repàs
Volcà de Repassot
Volcà del Cairat
Volcà de Claperols
Volcà del Puig de l’Ós
Volcà del Puig de l’Estany
Volcà del Puig de Bellaire
Volcà de Gengí
Volcà del Bac de les Tries
Volcà de les Bisaroques
Volcà de la Garrinada
Volcà del Montsacopa
Volcà de Montolivet
Volcà de Can Barraca
Volcà del Puig Astrol
Volcà de Pujalós
Volcà del Puig de la Garsa
Volcà del Croscat
Volcà de Cabrioler
Volcà del Puig Jordà
Volcà del Puig de la Costa
Volcà del Puig de Martinyà
Volcà del Puig de Mar
Volcà de Santa Margarida
Volcà de Comadega
Volcà del Puig Subià
Volcà de Rocanegra
Volcà de Simon
Volcà del Pla sa Ribera
Volcà de Sant Jordi
Volcà del Racó
Volcà de Fontpobra
Volcà de la Tuta de Colltort
Volcà de Can Tià
Volcà de Sant Marc
Volcà del Puig Roig
Volcà del Traiter
Volcà de les Medes

Additionally, there are at least seven other volcanoes located in the Province of Girona:
Volcà de la Crosa de Sant Dalmai
Volcà del Puig d’Adri
El Rocàs
Volcà del Clot de l’Omera
Volcà del Puig de la Banya del Boc
Volcà de Granollers de Rocacorba
Puig Montner

Major eruptions

Notes
1 Only eruptions with established and documented references that describe eruptive processes.

See also
Geology of the Canary Islands
Lists of volcanoes

References

General references

Notes

External links
Volcanic areas in Spain 

Spain
Volcanoes